The following lists events that happened in 1972 in Iceland.

Incumbents
President – Kristján Eldjárn
Prime Minister – Ólafur Jóhannesson

Events
 Worship of Norse gods is revived and officially approved.

Births

29 March – Hera Björk, singer
9 April – Steinunn Kristín Þórðardóttir, businesswoman
18 July – Hannes Stefánsson, chess Grandmaster
28 October – Guðmundur Steingrímsson, politician.
12 December – Eygló Harðardóttir, politician
29 December – Reynir Grétarsson, businessman

Deaths

References

 
1970s in Iceland
Iceland
Iceland
Years of the 20th century in Iceland